Pasteurella anatis, also Gallibacterium anatis is a Gram-negative, nonmotile, penicillin-sensitive coccobacillus of the family Pasteurellaceae. Bacteria from this family cause zoonotic infections in humans. These infections manifest themselves as skin or soft tissue infections after an animal bite. This species is found in chickens. Infected chicken may exhibit sinusitis, nasal discharge, drop in egg production, and low mortality.

Vaccination
Vaccines for chickens have been developed using bacterial outer membrane vesicles purified by hydrostatic filtration dialysis. Several of these have successfully produced immunity in domestic chicken. Antenucci et al 2020 demonstrates the most consistent product and effective immune provocation among HFD OMV processes, but overall HFD has yet to prove itself against other vaccine production techniques. Nonetheless it is a very promising line of research .

See also
 Pasteurella dagmatis
 Pasteurella canis
 Pasteurella stomatis
 Pasteurella langaa
 The VetBact database

References

Further reading

External links
 Animal bite infections (healthAtoZ.com)
 VetBact entry
 Bacterio entry

Bacterial diseases
Zoonoses
Pasteurellales
Bacteria described in 1985